On the Menu was an American reality competition series on TNT. It was the first cooking show that gave viewers the chance to taste the winning dish. In each episode, four home cooks battled for the chance to have their dish served in a national restaurant chain. The show featured Ty Pennington as host and Emeril Lagasse as menu master. It was produced by Mark Burnett.

Format
Each episode begins with the cooks demonstrating they understand the featured restaurant during a preliminary challenge. In the second round, the three remaining contestants create a new dish for the restaurant. The dishes are served to diners whose votes determine which two cooks will move onto the final round. In the final round, the cooks have the opportunity to perfect their dishes based on comments they received from the diners before serving them to Ty, Emeril and representatives of the restaurant. Those representatives determine the winner, whose dish was put on the restaurant’s menu the next day.

Episodes

This episode had two winners (Nicole & Lynn), both dishes are available on the menu.

References

External links
 
 

2014 American television series debuts
2010s American cooking television series
2010s American reality television series
English-language television shows
Food reality television series
Television series by MGM Television
TNT (American TV network) original programming